Saint Pius X Catholic High School A Specialist School in Humanities is a co-educational secondary school situated in Wath-upon-Dearne near Rotherham, South Yorkshire, England which caters for pupils aged 11 to 16. In September 2007 it was awarded specialist status as a Humanities College, and was renamed from Pope Pius X Catholic High School to Saint Pius X Catholic High School A Specialist School in Humanities. It also has Investors in People accreditation. The school opened in September 1957 with 300 pupils. The current headteacher is Miss Susan Smith.

Ofsted inspections
Since the commencement of Ofsted inspections in September 1993, the school has undergone nine inspections:

Headteachers
 Mr Dave Caulfield, ????–???? (acting head)
 Mrs Anne Winfield, September 2000–August 2009
 Mrs Eileen Gilmartin, September 2009–August 2011 (acting headteacher)
 Mr Tony Bishop, September 2011–August 2016
 Miss Susan Smith, September 2016–present

References

External links 
 School website

Educational institutions established in 1957
Catholic secondary schools in the Diocese of Hallam
Secondary schools in Rotherham
1957 establishments in England
Voluntary aided schools in Yorkshire